Jawed Sheikh (also spelled Javaid and Javed; born 8 October 1949) is a Pakistani actor, film director and producer who works in Lollywood and Bollywood. He is best known for working in the Hindi films Om Shanti Om, My Name Is Anthony Gonsalves, Namastey London, etc.

Career
Born in Rawalpindi, Jawed Sheikh made his acting debut in the Lollywood film Dhamaka, written by Pakistani writer Ibn-e-Safi released on 14 December 1974. He acted in over 100 films in Urdu, Sinhala and Punjabi. He has also appeared in many television serials which have aired on PTV, Hum TV, Geo Entertainment and A-Plus. The first film he directed was Mushkil, released in 1995. In 2002, he directed Yeh Dil Aap Ka Huwa, in which he also played a supporting role.

In 2005, he switched to acting in Bollywood films and appeared in films like Shikhar (2005) and Jaan-E-Mann (2006). In 2007 he appeared in Namaste London, Om Shanti Om and the Pakistani film Mein Ek Din Laut Kay Aaoon Ga. In 2008, he played a supporting role in Jannat. His most recent film as director was Khulay Aasman Ke Neechay, a big-budget film shot in four countries (Pakistan, India, United Arab Emirates and Australia). He has continued to appear in television series in Pakistan and recently appeared in many hit films in Pakistan such as Na Maloom Afraad (2014), Bin Roye (2015), Wrong No. (2015), Jawani Phir Nahi Ani (2015), Mehrunisa V Lub U (2017) and Na Maloom Afraad 2 (2017). He has occasionally returned to Bollywood as well appearing with Ranbir Kapoor in the Bollywood film Tamasha (2014) and with his daughter Momal Sheikh in Happy Bhaag Jayegi (2016). In 2018, Sheikh directed and acted in the film Wujood and appeared as a ghost named Dwarka Prasad in successful comedy film Saat Din Mohabbat In. His latest release is the hugely successful action comedy Teefa in Trouble.

Personal life
Sheikh's first marriage was with Zinat Mangi, a television and film supporting actress of that era, with whom he has a daughter, Momal Sheikh and a son Shehzad Sheikh. His second marriage was to a British singer and actress, Salma Agha. Since his second divorce, he is still officially single but has been linked to several Lollywood film actresses. He is the brother of Saleem Sheikh and Safeena Sheikh, brother-in-law of Behroze Sabzwari and uncle of Shehroz Sabzwari. In news media interviews, he has a reputation of speaking frankly and candidly.

Selected filmography

As a director and actor

As a film actor

As a television actor

 Ankahi (1982) Pakistan Television Corporation or PTV
 Tere Mere Beech (2015) Hum TV
 Two in One (PTV)
 Chaandni Raatain (PTV)
 Kesi Yeh Agan (PTV)
 Insan aur Aadmi
 Shama
 Aagahi
 Panah
 Mata e Jaan
 Fifty Fifty (PTV)
 Parchahiyan
 Azar Ki Ayegi Baraat
 Bol Meri Machli
 Dolly ki Ayegi Baraat
 Takkay ki Ayegi Baraat
 Pagal Pan
 Thori Si Mohabbat
 Kitni Girhain Baqi Hain
 Ishq Gumshuda
 Kuch Dil Ne Kaha
 Annie Ki Ayegi Baraat (2012)
 Band Baje ga
 Zindagi Gulzar Hai (2012-13)
 Meri Behan Maya
 Na Kaho Tum Mere Nahi
 Nanhi
 Rasam
 Billo, Bablu aur Bhaiyya
 Kabhi Kabhi
 Dhol Bajnay Laga
 Meray Khuda
 Guzaarish
 De Ijazat Jo Tu
 Yeh Mera Deewanapan Hai
 Tishnagi Dil Ki
 Ru Baru Ishq Tha
 Kuch is Tarah
 Beti
 Dil Ek Khilona Tha (2016-2017) Express Entertainment
 Khwab Tabeer (2013-2014) PTV Home
 Kuch Is Tarah (2018) PTV Home
 Rishtay Biktay Hain (2019)
 Kasak
 Prem Gali (2020)
 Foreign Love Affair (2021)
 Shehnai (2021)
 Dobara (2021)
 Dil-e-Momin (2021)
 Angna (2022)
 Afrah Tafreeh (2022)
 Pyar Deewangi Hai (2022)
 Habs (2022)
 Taqdeer (2022)
 Mujhe Pyaar Hua Tha (2022)
 Samjhota (2023)

Awards and nominations

Javed Sheikh talks about the worst time of his life. NewsPortal - Web Desk 13th Sep, 2022. 08:44 pm

References

External links

1954 births
Living people
Pakistani male film actors
Pakistani film directors
Pakistani film producers
Urdu film producers
Pakistani television directors
Nigar Award winners
Male actors in Hindi cinema
Pakistani male television actors
Punjabi people
People from Rawalpindi
Male actors from Rawalpindi
Recipients of the Pride of Performance
Pakistani expatriate male actors in India